The Tamansky otdel, known before 1910 as the Temryuksky otdel, was a Cossack district (otdel) of the Kuban oblast of the Caucasus Viceroyalty of the Russian Empire. It bordered the Yeysky otdel to the north, the Black Sea to the west, the Black Sea Governorate to the south, and the Kavkazsky and Yekaterinodarsky otdels to the east. The area of the Tamansky otdel mostly corresponded to the contemporary Krasnodar Krai region of Russia. The district's administrative capital was the stanitsa of Slavyanskaya (Slavyansk-na-Kubani).

Administrative divisions 
The subcounties (uchastoks) of the Tamansky otdel in 1912 were as follows:

Demographics

Russian Empire Census 
The majority of the population indicated Ukrainian to be their mother tongue, with a significant Russian speaking minority.

Kavkazskiy kalendar 

Notes

References

Bibliography 

Otdels of Kuban Oblast
Kuban Oblast
Caucasus Viceroyalty (1801–1917)
History of Kuban